James Dewitt Yancey (February 7, 1974 – February 10, 2006), better known by the stage names J Dilla and Jay Dee, was an American record producer, drummer, rapper and songwriter. He emerged in the mid-1990s underground hip hop scene in Detroit, Michigan, as a member of the group Slum Village. He was also a member of the Soulquarians, a musical collective active during the late 1990s and early 2000s.

Yancey died at the age of 32 from a combination of TTP and lupus. Although his life was short, he is considered one of the most influential producers in hip hop and popular music. Dilla's music raised the artistic level of hip-hop production in Detroit. According to The Guardian, "His affinity for crafting lengthy, melodic loops peppered with breakbeats and vocal samples took instrumental hip-hop into new, more musically complex realms."  In particular, his approach to drum programming, with its loose, or "drunk" style that avoided quantization, has been influential on producers and drummers.

Biography

Early life 
James Yancey grew up in Detroit, Michigan. The family lived in a house on the northeast corner of McDougall and Nevada, on the east side of Detroit. Yancey's parents had musical backgrounds; his mother, Maureen "Ma Dukes" Yancey, is a former opera singer and his father, Beverly Dewitt Yancey, was a jazz bassist, and performed Globetrotters half-time shows for several years. Yancey's mother said that he could "match pitch perfect harmony" before he learned how to speak.

Along with a range of other musical genres, Yancey developed a passion for hip hop music. After transferring from Davis Aerospace Technical High School to Pershing High School, he befriended his classmates T3 and Baatin through their mutual interest in rap battles; the three later formed the rap group Slum Village. Yancey also took up beat-making using a simple tape deck as the center of his studio. In his teenage years, he "stayed in the basement alone" to train himself to produce beats with his growing record collection.

Early career 
In 1992, Yancey met the Detroit musician Amp Fiddler, who let him use his Akai MPC, a music workstation, which he quickly mastered. Fiddler, while playing keyboards with Funkadelic on the 1994 Lollapalooza tour, met Q-Tip of A Tribe Called Quest, who were also on the lineup. Fiddler introduced Q-Tip to Yancey, who gave Q-Tip a Slum Village demo tape. In 1995, Yancey and MC Phat Kat formed 1st Down and became the first Detroit hip hop group to sign with a major label (Payday Records). The deal ended after one single when the label terminated.

In 1995, Yancey recorded the Yester Years EP with 5 Elementz (a group consisting of Proof, Thyme and Mudd). In 1996, he formed Slum Village and recorded what would become their debut album Fantastic, Vol. 1 at RJ Rice Studios. Upon its release in 1997, the album quickly became popular with fans of Detroit hip hop. Many journalists compared Slum Village to A Tribe Called Quest. However, Yancey said he felt uncomfortable with the comparison and often voiced it in several interviews.

By the mid-1990s Yancey had a string of singles and remix projects for artists such as Janet Jackson, The Pharcyde, De La Soul, Busta Rhymes, A Tribe Called Quest, Q-Tip's solo album and others. Many of these productions were released without his name recognition, being credited to the Ummah, a production collective composed of him, Q-Tip and Ali Shaheed Muhammad of A Tribe Called Quest, and later Raphael Saadiq of Tony! Toni! Toné!. However, he was given songwriting credit on all of his non-remix productions under the Ummah.

Under this umbrella, Yancey produced original songs and remixes for Janet Jackson, Busta Rhymes, Brand New Heavies, Something For the People, trip hop artists Crustation and many others.  He handled production on seven tracks from The Pharcyde's album Labcabincalifornia, released in the holiday season of 1995 and Hello, the debut album by Poe, released earlier that year on Modern Records.

Performing career 
2000 marked the major label debut of Slum Village with Fantastic, Vol. 2, creating a new following for Yancey as a producer and an MC. He was also a founding member of the production collective known as The Soulquarians (along with Ahmir "Questlove" Thompson, D'Angelo and James Poyser amongst others) which earned him more recognition. He subsequently worked with Erykah Badu, Poe, Talib Kweli, and Common—contributing heavily to the latter's critically acclaimed breakthrough album, Like Water for Chocolate.

His debut as a solo artist came in 2001 with the single "Fuck the Police" (Up Above Records), followed by the album Welcome 2 Detroit, which began British independent record label BBE's "Beat Generation" series. In 2001, Yancey began using the name J Dilla to differentiate himself from Jermaine Dupri who also goes by "J.D." He left Slum Village to pursue a major label solo career with MCA Records.

In 2002, Yancey produced Frank-N-Dank's 48 Hours, as well as a solo album, but neither record was ever released, although the former surfaced through bootlegging. When Yancey finished working with Frank-N-Dank on the 48 Hours album, MCA Records requested a record with a larger commercial appeal, and the artists re-recorded the majority of the tracks, this time using little to no samples. Despite this, neither versions of the album were successful, and Yancey stated that he was disappointed that the music never got out to the fans.

Around this time, Yancey also assisted in the production of singer and fellow Soulquarian Bilal's second album, Love for Sale. The singer credited Yancey with showing him a unique approach to drum programming: "He had this thing where no matter what he picked up he could bend his will into it. Just because you hear it so strong in your head you can throw the funk in it."

Yancey was signed to a solo deal with MCA Records in 2002. Although Yancey was known as a producer rather than an MC, he chose to rap on the album and have the music produced by some of his favorite producers, such as Madlib, Pete Rock, Hi-Tek, Supa Dave West, Kanye West, Nottz, Waajeed and others. The album was shelved due to internal changes at the label and MCA.

While the record with MCA stalled, Yancey recorded Ruff Draft, released exclusively to vinyl by German label Groove Attack.  The album was also unsuccessful, but his work from this point on was increasingly released through independent record labels. In a 2003 interview with Groove Attack, Yancey talked about this change of direction:

Later life and death 
The Los Angeles producer and MC Madlib began collaborating with Yancey, and the pair formed the group Jaylib in 2002, releasing an album called Champion Sound in 2003. Yancey relocated from Detroit to Los Angeles in 2004 and appeared on tour with Jaylib in Spring 2004.

Yancey's illness and medication caused dramatic weight loss in 2003 onwards, forcing him to publicly confirm speculation about his health in 2004. Despite a slower output of major releases and production credits in 2004 and 2005, his cult status remained strong within his core audience, as evidenced by unauthorized circulation of his underground "beat tapes" (instrumental, and raw working materials), mostly through internet file sharing.

Articles in publications URB (March 2004) and XXL (June 2005) confirmed rumors of ill health and hospitalization during this period, but these were downplayed by Jay himself. The seriousness of his condition became public in November 2005 when Yancey toured Europe performing from a wheelchair. It was later revealed that he suffered from thrombotic thrombocytopenic purpura (a rare blood disease), and lupus.

Near the end of his life, he was mostly hospital bound, which eventually left him in debt – after his medical insurance was dropped following a late payment. His mother, Maureen Yancey, recalled paying $500,000 a month.

Yancey died on February 10, 2006, at his home in Los Angeles, California, three days after his 32nd birthday and the release of his final album, Donuts. Maureen said that the cause was cardiac arrest.

Musical style 

Before Yancey, most popular music had used one of two rhythmic "feels": straight and swung, meaning that music was played in even or uneven pulses. According to the journalist Dan Charnas, Yancey juxtaposed both styles, creating "a new, pleasurable, orienting rhythmic friction and new time-feel". Yancey used an Akai MPC3000 and disabled the quantize feature to create his signature "off-kilter" sampling style.

Posthumous releases 
At the time of his death, Yancey had several projects planned for future completion and release. According to founding Slum Village member T3 in an interview in March 2015, Yancey had about 150 unreleased beats, some of which featured on Slum Village's album entitled Yes!, released June 16, 2015.

The Shining was "75% completed when Dilla died" and was finished by Karriem Riggins and later released on August 8, 2006, on BBE Records.

Ruff Draft was reissued as a double CD/LP set in March 2007 and is sometimes considered his third solo album. The reissue contains unreleased material from the Ruff Draft sessions and instrumentals. It was also released in a cassette tape format, paying homage to Yancey's dirty, grimy sound (he was known for recording over two-tracked instrumentals).

Sniperlite was an EP released by the hip hop collaboration Dilla Ghost Doom, consisting of Yancey, Ghostface Killah, and MF Doom.  It was recorded sometime in 2005 before Yancey's passing.  It was subsequently released in 2008 by Stones Throw Records.

Jay Love Japan was announced in 2005 as his debut release on the Operation Unknown label. Though it saw a 2006 release in Japan, it was heavily bootlegged elsewhere and did not receive an official release until 2016.

Champion Sound, Yancey's and Madlib's collaborative album, was reissued in June 2007 by Stones Throw Records as a 2-CD Deluxe Edition with instrumentals and b-sides.

Yancey Boys, the debut album by Yancey's younger brother John Yancey, was released in 2008 on Delicious Vinyl Records. It is produced entirely by Yancey and features rapping by his brother, under the name 'Illa J'. Stones Throw Records released a digital instrumental version of the album in 2009.

Jay Stay Paid, an album featuring 28 previously unreleased instrumental tracks made at various points in his career, was released in 2009 by Nature Sounds. Vocals to a select few of the tracks were provided by rappers who were close to Yancey though the majority of the album is instrumental. The project was mixed and arranged by Pete Rock.

In 2010, unreleased production and vocals from Yancey were featured on Slum Village's sixth studio album Villa Manifesto, the first album with all five members.

In December 2011, Jonathan Taylor, CEO of the Yancey Music Group (founded by Yancey's mother Maureen Yancey), told the UK's Conspiracy Worldwide radio show that the album Rebirth of Detroit was ready for a May 2012 release. On May 25, 2012, Mahogani Music released a limited edition 12" vinyl titled Dillatroit/Rebirth Promo EP, leading up to the official release of Rebirth of Detroit on June 12, 2012.

In 2014, Yancey's long-lost MCA Records album entitled The Diary was scheduled for release, but was delayed to April 15, 2016, via Mass Appeal Records. Intended for release in 2002, the album is a collection of Yancey's vocal performances over production by Madlib, Pete Rock, Nottz, House Shoes, Karriem Riggins, and others. The first single is the album's intro cut, "The Introduction."

In 2020, Dres of Black Sheep announced that he would be releasing a collaborative album with Yancey titled No Words, with unreleased instrumentals of Yancey's provided with the cooperation of his mother.

The 20th anniversary edition of Welcome 2 Detroit was released in February 2021.

Legacy 

Yancey was survived by two daughters. In May 2006, Yancey's mother announced the creation of the J Dilla Foundation, which will work to cure people affected by lupus.

Yancey's death has had a significant impact on the hip-hop community. Besides countless tribute tracks and concerts, Yancey's death created a wealth of interest in his remaining catalog and, consequently, Yancey's influence on hip-hop production became more apparent.

"Highly influential for both producers and drummers", he made "innovative" use of the MPC sampler, by employing real-time rhythms and choosing not to quantize them, thus creating a "drunk" and "laid-back" style which "[was] a significant contribution to contemporary popular music that evade[d] quick interpretation, transcription and definition". Questlove – who considers Yancey the "world's greatest drummer" – stated that he "invented the sound we call neo-soul" and actively sought to emulate Yancey. The University of Illinois' Adam Kruse states that Yancey is "considered one of the greatest beat producers in hip-hop's history".

Dave Chappelle gives a special dedication to Yancey in his movie Dave Chappelle's Block Party, which includes the statement: "This film is dedicated to the life and memory of Music Producer J Dilla, aka Jay Dee (James D. Yancey)". The film focuses mostly on members of the Soulquarians, a collective of hip-hop musicians of which Yancey was also a member.

Yancey's music has been used in various television programs. In 2006, Cartoon Network's late night programing block Adult Swim played the songs "Waves", "Welcome to the Show", and "Mash" during the commercial bumpers in between shows, as well as a number of tracks on their Chrome Children EP. In May 2010, UK mobile network O2 used Jaylib's "The Red" instrumental in their "Pool Party" ad. A recent BBC documentary inspired by the Olympic runner Usain Bolt contained two Yancey-produced songs—"So Far To Go" by Common and "Runnin'" by the Pharcyde.

In February 2007, a year after his death, Yancey posthumously received the PLUG Awards Artist of the Year as well as the award for Record Producer of the Year. In Yancey's hometown of Detroit, Detroit Techno veteran Carl Craig has fronted a movement to install a plaque in honor of Yancey in Conant Gardens (where the artist grew up and initiated his career). A resolution for the proposed plaque was passed by the Detroit Entertainment Commission in May 2010, and is currently awaiting approval by the Detroit City Council.

Despite these accolades, there have been documented conflicts between his mother and the executor of his estate Arthur Erk regarding future Dilla releases. In an interview with LA Weekly, Erk described how difficult it was for the estate to "protect his legacy" due to bootlegging and unofficial mixtapes.  He stressed how important it was for the estate to gather all possible income related to Yancey's name, as Yancey had to borrow money from the government due to mounting medical bills at the end of his life.

A few weeks later Yancey's mother, who has appeared on such unofficial mixtapes as Busta Rhymes' Dillagence, gave her take on these issues. In addition to stating that Arthur Erk and Yancey's estate has chosen not to communicate with his family, she has stated that he has barred anyone from use of Yancey's likeness or name.

Mrs. Yancey also has mentioned that Erk was in fact Yancey's accountant and not his business manager in his lifetime, and that he fell into his position because she and Yancey were first and foremost concerned about his health and not with getting paperwork in order. She also stated that Yancey's friends in the hip-hop community, such as Erykah Badu, Busta Rhymes, Madlib, Common and The Roots, have contacted her personally for future projects with Yancey beats, but the estate has vetoed all future projects not contracted prior to Yancey's death. She also implied that Yancey would not support the estate's practices, such as their prosecution of bootleggers and file sharers.

Due to Yancey's debt to the government, the family receives no income from projects. Yancey's children are being supported by the social security their mothers have drawn. Likewise, Mrs. Yancey is also still paying off Yancey's medical bills that she helped finance, leaving her also in tremendous debt. She still lives in the same Detroit ghetto, is still a daycare worker at Conant Gardens and also suffers from lupus, the same disease which killed Yancey. To help pay the cost of medication and keep her household afloat, Delicious Vinyl donated all proceeds of Jay Dee – The Delicious Vinyl Years to Mrs. Yancey in 2007. In 2008, Giant Peach created a donation PayPal account for her and RenSoul.com released a charity mixtape.

According to his mother, the family lost their old home in Detroit due to her taking care of Yancey in his final days. The mother of one of Yancey's children, Monica Whitlow, also broke her silence on the issue of the estate and his legacy:

On January 24, 2010, an announcement was made on j-dilla.com, regarding the Yancey Estate and the Yancey family.

In mid-2012, Montpellier, France, dedicated a small street "Allée Jay Dee".

In 2014, Maureen Yancey donated Yancey's custom-made Minimoog Voyager synthesizer and Akai MPC3000 to the Smithsonian's National Museum of African American History and Culture. They are part of the "Musical Crossroads" exhibit.

A Yancey-inspired donut shop opened in Detroit on May 3, 2016, to a great reception. Created by Yancey's uncle Herman Hayes to honor his nephew's legacy, it sold out three times on its first day.

The book, Dilla Time, by Dan Charnas, about Yancey's life, work, and influence premiered at #4 on the New York Times bestseller list in February 2022.

Discography

Studio albums 

 2001: Welcome 2 Detroit
 2003: Champion Sound (with Madlib as Jaylib)
 2006: Donuts

Posthumously released studio albums 
 2006: The Shining
 2007: Jay Love Japan
 2009: Jay Stay Paid
 2016: The Diary

Extended plays 
 2002: Vol. 1: Unreleased
 2003: Vol. 2: Vintage
 2003: Ruff Draft (2003 release)

Compilations 
 2007: Jay Deelicious: The Delicious Vinyl Years
 2009: Dillanthology 1: Dilla's Productions for Various Artists
 2009: Dillanthology 2: Dilla's Remixes for Various Artists
 2009: Dillanthology 3: Dilla's Productions
 2013: Lost Tapes, Reels + More
 2015: Jay Dee a.k.a. J Dilla 'The King of Beats' (Box Set)
 2015: Dillatronic
 2016: Jay Dee a.k.a. J Dilla 'The King of Beats', Vol. 2: Lost Scrolls
 2016: Jay Dee's Ma Dukes Collection
 2017: J Dilla's Delights, Vol. 1
 2017: J Dilla's Delights, Vol. 2

Posthumously released work 
 2006: Donuts EP: J. Rocc's Picks (EP)
 2006: The Shining
 2007: Ruff Draft (Reissue)
 2007: Jay Love Japan
 2008: Sniperlite 
 2009: Jay Stay Paid
 2010: Donut Shop (EP)
 2012: Dillatroit (EP)
 2012: Rebirth of Detroit
 2013: The Lost Scrolls, Vol. 1 (EP)
 2013: Diamonds & Ice (EP)
 2014: Give Them What They Want (EP)
 2016: The Diary
 2016: Back to the Crib (Mixtape)
 2017: Motor City

References

Further reading

External links 

Official sites
  – official site
 J Dilla Foundation

Resources
 J Dilla / Jaylib / Slum Village / The Ummah / The Soulquarians / 1st Down discographies at Discogs
 J Dilla discography at Stones Throw Records

Misc.
 How J Dilla humanized his MPC3000 – Vox Earworm episode on YouTube, December 6, 2017

 
20th-century American drummers
African-American drummers
African-American male rappers
American jazz drummers
Delicious Vinyl artists
MCA Records artists
Musicians from Michigan
Rappers from Detroit
Midwest hip hop musicians
American hip hop record producers
Deaths from thrombotic thrombocytopenic purpura
Deaths from lupus
1974 births
2006 deaths
Underground rappers
Stones Throw Records artists
Burials at Forest Lawn Memorial Park (Glendale)
20th-century American musicians
21st-century American musicians
African-American record producers
American hip hop DJs
Pershing High School alumni
People with lupus
Soulquarians members
Slum Village members
20th-century American male musicians
Barely Breaking Even artists